Jerick Deshun McKinnon (born May 3, 1992), nicknamed "Jet", is an American football running back who is a free agent. He played college football at Georgia Southern and was drafted by the Minnesota Vikings in the third round of the 2014 NFL Draft. He has also played for the San Francisco 49ers.

High school career
McKinnon attended Sprayberry High School in Marietta, Georgia, where he played football and ran track. In football, he played quarterback, running back and wide receiver. He was an Atlanta Journal-Constitution first-team all-state pick at quarterback. He was also tabbed first-team all-state by the Georgia Sports Writers Association as an athlete and named Region VII AAAA Player of the Year. He lettered four times on the gridiron for the Yellow Jackets, starting in each of his final three seasons. As a junior, he was a member of the team that won the region championship playing as a wide receiver en route to earning MVP accolades for the National Underclassmen Ultimate 100. He passed for 1,500 yards and rushed for 1,300 more as a senior, picking up Cobb County Touchdown Club Quarterback of the Year honors in 2009.

Away from the gridiron, McKinnon lettered twice for the Yellow Jackets track & field team, competing in the 100-meter dash (captured the Region VII-AAAA title with a time of 11.04 seconds as a junior), 200-meter dash (placed seventh at the Region VII-AAAA with a time 22.61 seconds) and in the long jump (personal-best leap of 21'8" or 6.63 meters) for the outdoor squad. He was also a member of the 4 × 100 m relay team (42.33 as a senior) and was timed at 4.46 in the 40-yard dash according to Rivals.com.

Regarded as a three-star recruit by Rivals.com, McKinnon committed to Georgia Southern on February 3, 2010. He chose the Eagles over scholarship offers from the Air Force and the Navy.

College career
McKinnon attended Georgia Southern University from 2010 to 2013.

McKinnon was originally recruited as a quarterback, handling special team chores before being used as a quarterback and slotback during the 2010 campaign. He played in GSU's triple-option attack from the quarterbacking position through his junior season but was utilized more often as a tailback during his senior season. McKinnon, a four-year letter winner, finished his career third all-time on the Georgia Southern list with 3,899 rushing yards and 42 touchdowns (4,138 all-purpose), behind only Adrian Peterson, who had 6,559 yards (NCAA Division I all-time leading rusher from 1998 to 2001) and Jermaine Austin, who posted 5,411 from 2002 to 2005. He also caught 10 passes for 165 yards and a score, completed 32-of-81 passes (39.50%) for 929 yards, 12 touchdowns, and five interceptions, gained 74 yards on four kickoff returns and also recorded five tackles (four solos) with a pair of pass deflections, two interceptions, and two quarterback pressures.

Freshman season (2010)

In his first season in Statesboro, McKinnon chose to wear number 15. He played in 10 games for the Eagles, rushing for 430 yards on 109 attempts and 3 touchdowns. He picked up his first career score against Savannah State, taking over the quarterback duties in the fourth quarter. He briefly owned the record for most rushing attempts in a single game after rushing for a top single-game mark of 182 yards on 35 attempts at The Citadel, 84 of those yards came in the second quarter as he helped lead the Eagles to their first shutout of an opponent since 2003. In the GSU game, McKinnon assumed signal calling after Jaybo Shaw was injured early in the game. He made his first career start against Samford the following week, and had a one-yard touchdown run for his first score against the Bulldogs. He directed the Eagles to their third-highest rushing total of the year with 323 yards against South Carolina State.

Sophomore season (2011)

McKinnon played in 13 games with seven starts as a sophomore. He was the only player on the Eagles roster to throw, run and catch a touchdown pass during the season. He finished the season with 705 all-purpose yards and nine combined touchdowns (seven rushing, one receiving, and one passing). In the season opener at Samford on September 3, he rushed 12 times for 80 yards and scored two touchdowns. He rushed for a touchdown and caught a touchdown pass in the home opener against Tusculum on September 10. Against Western Carolina in week 4, he totaled a season-high 114 rushing yards and two scores on 10 carries and completed two passes for 39 yards and a touchdown. He compiled 98 rushing yards on just nine carries against Presbyterian. He played three playoff games on defense and totaled four tackles and two pass breakups, while also intercepting two passes in the Maine FCS Playoff game. In that game, he also returned one kickoff for 41 yards.

Junior season (2012)

In 2012, McKinnon joined Georgia Southern's upper echelon of running backs with 1,817 rushing yards on 269 attempts, third-highest single-season total after Adrian Peterson's record 1,932 yards in 1998 and Jayson Foster in second with 1,844 in 2007. For his season efforts, he earned first-team All-American honors at quarterback from the College Sports Journal and College Sporting News and was awarded the Iron Works Dedication Trophy (awarded to the team's most outstanding lifter). McKinnon's team-best 129.8 rushing yards per game average ranked seventh nationally and was 8th on Georgia Southern's single-season list, most by a quarterback since Jayson Foster in 2007 (167.6), while his 20 rushing touchdowns in the season ranked seventh on the single-season list. He led the Eagles in rushing six times, with significant influence on Georgia Southern's ninth NCAA rushing title (399.4 ypg), best across all divisions. He was also a factor in Eagles claiming four of the top seven NCAA Division I single-game rushing totals. Of Georgia Southern's 63 offensive plays of 25 yards or longer in 2012, McKinnon had a hand in 30 (17 rushing plays, seven rushing touchdowns).

In the season opener against Jacksonville, he rushed for 71 yards and a touchdown playing at both B-back and quarterback. On December 2, he had top season marks for rushing attempts with 34 and rushing yards with 316 against Central Arkansas in a playoff game (12–1), to surpass the single-game record for rushing yards by a quarterback, previously held by Jayson Foster. McKinnon's 316-yard effort was third-best in the FCS, eighth-best in Division I and just 17 yards shy of tying the Georgia Southern single-game record held by Adrian Peterson, who had 333 against UMass back in 1999. His longest runs were of 57, 52 and 51 yards; the 57-yarder romp ended the Eagles’ three-play scoring drive for the first touchdown of the game, while the 51-yarder brought Georgia Southern inside the 10 where he punched it in for his second rushing touchdown of the day. He was also credited with 79 passing yards against the Bears, including a 47-yard completion to Zach Walker and a 32-yard touchdown reception by Darreion Robinson. He gained 171 yards and scored a season-best four rushing touchdown against Old Dominion with three of them coming in the fourth quarter. After flipping roles with Darreion Robinson, he caught a 15-yard pass to convert on 3rd-and-6 in ODU territory. Against Furman, he flirted with the 200-yard rushing yards total, but finished with 198 and three rushing touchdowns. Against Howard, he accounted for five touchdowns, three rushing and two pass completions for touchdowns. He sprinted for a season-long rush of 87 yards for a touchdown in only 12 seconds. McKinnon's 87-yard scoring play against the Bisons ranks as the third-longest in Georgia Southern history behind only Mark Myer's 92-yard score run against Appalachian State in 2002 and Adrian Peterson's 91-yard score against East Tennessee State in 1998. He had two passing touchdowns at Western Carolina. He hooked up with Zack Walker for one of the shortest touchdown drives of the year, a career-long 75-yard pass, the longest pass completion of the 2012 season, and 11th-longest in Georgia Southern history, against Furman in a mere 10 seconds. In that game, he threw for a team season and career-best 119 yards against the Paladins. In a victory over Samford, he took over at quarterback and led the Eagles in rushing with 162 yards, averaging 12.5 yards per carry. He rushed for three touchdowns and a game-ending two-point conversion in a triple-overtime thriller at Chattanooga for a total of 20 points. He eluded three Moc defenders rolling left and dashing into the endzone for the game-winning touchdown and followed that play with the two-point conversion. His total of 141 rushing yards against the Mocs started his streak of seven-straight games with 100 or more rushing yards. Against the Mocs, went 3-for-5 passing for 55 yards with a long throw of 40 to Zach Walker for an acrobatic catch that was featured on ESPN SportsCenter’s Top 10 plays of the day. That second-quarter pass completion put the Eagles in the red zone, making the way for McKinnon's second score of the night. Following his junior season, McKinnon was recognized as a National Strength and Conditioning (NSCA) All-American Strength and earned the Conditioning Athlete of the Year Award. He finished his junior season eighth on the Georgia Southern career list (2,849 yards), just behind Tracy Ham’s 3,212 yards (total includes regular-season games only).

Senior season (2013)

As a senior in 2013, McKinnon's final year, he was Georgia Southern’s leading rusher with his second consecutive 1,000-yard rushing season with 1,050 yards (6.5 avg) and 12 rushing touchdowns, as well as four passing scores. He was selected for the initial watch list for the Walter Payton Award by The Sports Network and was named team MVP for the second straight year after earning the honors for the first time as a junior at the team's annual banquet. On November 23, he rushed for 125 yards on nine carries for a 13.9 average and scored the game-winning touchdown against Florida, which was Georgia Southern’s first win ever over a BCS team. He had a season-long run with a rush of 66 yards against the Gators, which was the longest recorded against the Gators in 2013. In week 1 against Savannah State, he scored the first touchdown of the Eagles’ 2013 season with a 66-yard run and threw for a touchdown with an eight-yard toss to Devin Scott against the Tigers, finishing the game with 107 rushing yards and 2 passes completed. He tied a career-best with two passing touchdowns against St. Francis, hitting Kentrellis Showers for a 35-yard touchdown pass and a season-long 50-yard score to Montay Crockett. He eclipsed the 3,000-yard rushing mark with 114 yards against Wofford with six double-digit carries and added two touchdowns in that game. Against The Citadel, he had two rushing touchdowns and 198 yards on the ground, and also picked up a reception and threw for the two-point conversion against the Bulldogs in that win. He directed the Eagles offense to majority of the 576 rushing yards and 10 touchdowns in the season opener as the highest single-game totals in NCAA Division I in 2013. McKinnon was involved in 12 of the Eagles’ longest plays of 2013, including the top three (two rushes of 66 yards, one 63-yard touchdown rush) and scored the first touchdown in six of the 10 games in which he played. He was honored as the Iron Works Dedication Award winner for the third time and second-straight year. Following his senior season, he was invited to the prestigious Reese's Senior Bowl.

Professional career

McKinnon was invited to the 2014 NFL Scouting Combine, where he improved his stock by running unofficial times of 4.38 and 4.35 in the 40-yard dash (4.41 official, 2nd fastest among RBs) while leading all running backs in bench press reps with 32. He also showcased his athletic ability with a broad jump of 11'0" (3.35 m) and a vertical leap of 40.5" (1.03 m). Only four players at the NFL Combine topped McKinnon's 40.5-inch vertical jump, while his three-cone drill mark of 6.83 seconds and short-shuttle clocking of 4.12 seconds were also some of the best marks in the running back group. McKinnon's 32 bench press reps are the most among current NFL running backs at the NFL Scouting Combine.

McKinnon was drafted in the 3rd round (96th overall) by the Minnesota Vikings in the 2014 NFL Draft. He was the seventh running back to be selected that year. The pick was obtained as part of the Percy Harvin trade to Seattle in 2013.

Minnesota Vikings

2014 season: Rookie year

As a rookie, McKinnon led the Vikings with a 4.8 yard per carry average and ranked second on the team in rushing yards despite only playing in 11 games with six starts. In the season opener against the St. Louis Rams on September 7, he caught his first NFL pass from Matt Cassel, which went for one yard. He recorded a pair of 100-yard games on the season, with the first of them coming in Week 4 against the Atlanta Falcons with 135 yards rushing on 18 carries with a long of 55, which was the fifth-longest run by a rookie running back in the NFL in 2014. He became the first Vikings rookie to break the 100-yard mark since Adrian Peterson did it back in 2007. The second of them came against the Buffalo Bills' No. 1-ranked rush defense in Week 7 (103 yards on 19 attempts). He started his first career game against the Detroit Lions in Week 6, joining fellow rookie quarterback Teddy Bridgewater as the first quarterback/running back rookie starting tandem since 1961 for the Vikings when Fran Tarkenton and Tommy Mason opened the Detroit game in 1961. He finished the game with 40 yards on 11 carries and 42 yards on 6 receptions. He missed the game against the Carolina Panthers on November 30 and his promising rookie campaign ended when he was placed on injured reserve on December 6. Overall, McKinnon finished his rookie year with 538 rushing yards and 135 receiving yards.

2015 season

In 2015, McKinnon led the team for the second straight season in yards per carry with a 5.2 average and logged a career-high three total touchdowns. In the Vikings’ 38–17 win over the Chicago Bears in Week 15, which was McKinnon's 25th game as a pro, he stepped in after Adrian Peterson left the game due to an injury and responded with seven carries for ten yards and a career-high four receptions for 76 yards, including his first NFL touchdown on a 17-yard reception. McKinnon had his first career multi-touchdown game against the New York Giants the following week, rushing for a seven-yard touchdown and a career-long 68-yard touchdown to solidify a playoff-clinching win for the Vikings. In Week 17, he caught a team-leading 3 passes for 33 yards, had 4 rushes for 15 yards, recorded one special teams tackle and returned one kick for 24 yards to help the Vikings clinch the NFC North title in the regular-season finale against the Green Bay Packers on January 3, 2016. Overall, he finished the 2015 season with 271 rushing yards, two rushing touchdowns, 173 receiving yards, and a receiving touchdown. In the Wild Card Round against the Seattle Seahawks, he finished with seven rushing yards and had three receptions for 22 yards in a narrow 10–9 loss.

2016 season

During Week 2, Adrian Peterson tore the meniscus in his right knee in a Sunday Night Football game against the Green Bay Packers in U.S. Bank Stadium, and after being placed on injured reserve, the Vikings announced McKinnon as the starter for the Week 3 game against the Carolina Panthers. Prior to the game, the team named Matt Asiata the starter, but McKinnon ended up leading the rushing attack with 45 yards on 16 carries and a 2-point conversion. In the Vikings' 24–10 victory over the New York Giants in Week 4, McKinnon earned the starting nod for the first time in the season and rushed 18 times for 85 yards and a touchdown, helping the team rush for a season-high 104 yards.

Overall, in 15 games in the 2016 season, McKinnon finished with 539 rushing yards, two rushing touchdowns, 43 receptions, 255 receiving yards, and two receiving touchdowns.

2017 season

McKinnon entered the 2017 season second on the depth chart behind rookie Dalvin Cook. After Cook tore his ACL in a Week 4 14–7 loss against the Detroit Lions, McKinnon remained second on the depth chart after being surpassed by Latavius Murray. On October 9, against the Chicago Bears, he had a season-high 95 rushing yards and a rushing touchdown in the 20–17 victory. On December 17, against the Cincinnati Bengals, McKinnon had seven receptions for 114 yards to go along with 24 rushing yards in the 34–7 victory. McKinnon finished the 2017 regular-season with a career-high 570 rushing yards and three touchdowns along with 51 receptions for 421 yards and two touchdowns.

The Vikings made the playoffs and earned a first-round bye with the #2-seed. In the Divisional Round against the New Orleans Saints, McKinnon rushed for 34 yards and a touchdown while also catching three receptions for six yards in a miraculous 29–24 victory. In the NFC Championship against the Philadelphia Eagles, he had 40 rushing yards to go along with 11 receptions for 86 yards in the 38–7 loss.

San Francisco 49ers

2018 season

On March 14, 2018, McKinnon signed a four-year, $30 million contract with the San Francisco 49ers.

On September 1, 2018, McKinnon tore his ACL during a team workout, prematurely ending his season. He was placed on injured reserve two days later.

2019 season

McKinnon suffered a setback from his knee surgery during training camp and was placed on season-ending injured reserve on August 31, 2019. Without McKinnon, the 49ers reached Super Bowl LIV, but lost 31–20 to the Kansas City Chiefs.

2020 season

McKinnon made his return to the NFL in Week 1 of the 2020 season against the Arizona Cardinals. He had three carries for 24 rushing yards to go along with three receptions for 20 receiving yards and one receiving touchdown in the 24–20 loss. During Week 2 against the New York Jets, McKinnon had a 55-yard run on a 3rd-and-31 situation. Overall, he finished the game with three attempts for 77 rushing yards (25.7 yards per carry) and a touchdown as the 49ers won 31–13. McKinnon scored a touchdown in the following two games to give him four consecutive games with a touchdown to start the season. Overall, McKinnon finished the 2020 season with 81 carries for 319 rushing yards and five rushing touchdowns to go along with 33 receptions for 253 receiving yards and one receiving touchdown.

Kansas City Chiefs

2021 season
McKinnon signed a one-year contract with the Kansas City Chiefs on April 30, 2021. He was placed on injured reserve on November 30. He was activated on January 1, 2022. In the regular season-ending Week 18 game against the Denver Broncos, McKinnon scored his first rushing touchdown with Kansas City. The Chiefs defeated the Broncos 28-24.

In the Wild Card Round against the Pittsburgh Steelers, McKinnon scored a receiving touchdown as part of a 142-scrimmage yard day in the 42–21 victory. He re-signed with the team on June 14, 2022.

2022 season
In week 13, McKinnon had seven receptions for 112 receiving yards and two receiving touchdowns in the 34–28 victory over the Denver Broncos. In week 17, McKinnon set an NFL record with five consecutive games with receiving touchdowns, a feat never before accomplished by a running back. He increased the streak to six games in Week 18. McKinnon finished the 2022 season with 72 carries for 291 rushing yards and one rushing touchdown to go along with 56 receptions for 512 receiving yards and nine receiving touchdowns.  His nine receiving touchdowns led the league for receiving touchdowns among running backs. In addition, he set a franchise record for most receiving touchdowns by a running back in a season. McKinnon later helped the Chiefs win Super Bowl LVII over the Philadelphia Eagles. In the game, McKinnon caught three passes for 15 yards and carried four times for 34 yards, including a crucial play in which he gave himself up short of the goal line following a 9-yard gain on Kansas City’s final drive—allowing the Chiefs to run an additional minute-plus off the clock and kick the game-winning field goal with eight seconds left.

NFL career statistics

Regular season

Postseason

References

External links

Kansas City Chiefs bio
Georgia Southern Eagles bio

1992 births
Living people
American football quarterbacks
American football running backs
Georgia Southern Eagles football players
Minnesota Vikings players
Kansas City Chiefs players
San Francisco 49ers players
Players of American football from Atlanta
Players of American football from Marietta, Georgia